Felix Blumenfeld's String Quartet in F major, Op. 26, is the composer's only work for the medium. Published in 1898, the quartet was dedicated to music publisher Mitrofan Belyayev.

Structure

The work is structured in four movements:

 Allegro - Poco più tranquillo - Tempo I - Allegro molto
 Presto - Molto meno mosso - Tempo del Scherzo (Presto) - Più mosso
 Andantino - Poco più mosso - Largamente
 Finale: Allegro molto - Un poco più tranquillo - Più mosso - Tempo I (Tranquillo) - Più tranquillo - Più mosso - Coda: Molto più mosso - Prestissimo 

The first commercial recording of the quartet by the Odessa quartet was released by Profil in 2015.

References
Notes

Sources

External links

Blumenfeld
1898 compositions
Compositions in F major